Lloyd T. "Rosy" Harr (April 14, 1896 – December 23, 1982) was an American football coach and college athletics administrator. He served as the head football coach at the College of Emporia in Emporia, Kansas from 1928 to 1930, compiling a record of 11–10–4. His 1928 team produced an undefeated record of 8–0 and was declared the champions of the newly-formed Central Intercollegiate Conference (CIC). Harr was also the athletic director at the College of Emporia until his resignation in 1931.

Harr died on December 23, 1982, in Fort Collins, Colorado.

Head coaching record

References

External links
 

1896 births
1982 deaths
American football halfbacks
College of Emporia Fighting Presbies athletic directors
College of Emporia Fighting Presbies football coaches
College of Emporia Fighting Presbies football players
Coaches of American football from Kansas
Players of American football from Kansas